Bladon Castle is a folly, partly converted into a country house, located some   southwest of the village of Newton Solney in South Derbyshire,   northeast of Burton-on-Trent and close to the point at which the River Trent forms the boundary with Staffordshire.

The castle was originally built as a folly in a Neo-Gothic style by the architect Jeffrey Wyattville for Abraham Hoskins of Burton-on-Trent, grandfather of George Gordon Hoskins. Designed to give the appearance of a large castle with battlements, the structure was in reality little more than a single long wall.

It was subsequently partly converted into a house.  The building lies within the grounds of Bladon House School, and is now in a semi-ruinous state.

References

Castles in Derbyshire
Folly castles in England